University Park is a master-planned neighborhood in Irvine, California. It is bounded by University Drive to the south, Culver Drive to the west, and the San Diego (I-405) Freeway to the north. Commercially advertised as Irvine's first "village", the neighborhood was named University Park due to its proximity to the University of California, Irvine.  University Park celebrated its 50th anniversary in July 2016.

History 
University Park was built in phases beginning in 1965 shortly after plans for a nearby University of California campus were announced. The neighborhood, whose opening predates Irvine's city-hood by five years, was envisioned to attract buyers from a wide range of demographics and was designed to offer various housing types to meet the diverse needs of its target residents. Designed in collaboration with Peter Walker, Dick Law, and Kalvin Platt of Sasaki, Walker and Associates, the neighborhood utilized the Garden City approach to planning by designing clusters of homes to face publicly-accessible park areas and greenbelts tucked away from principal roadways in order to create a lower dependence on automobiles. These greenbelts were also designed to link neighborhoods and amenities in the neighborhood, including schools, shopping centers, the library, and recreation areas. At the time of its construction, the neighborhoods's planning concepts were considered experimental, such as the use of rectangular cul-de-sacs containing greenery in the center. Home sales initially were slow due of the neighborhood's isolation from other built-up areas and also due to the incompletion of the nearby I-405 freeway. However, upon its eventual completion, the neighborhood contained Irvine's first library, high school, and retail shopping center.

Amenities, facilities, and neighborhoods 
University Park comprises multiple neighborhoods and associations and contains a high concentration of community facilities and amenities. In addition to its greenbelts and bikeways, the neighborhood contains community facilities, parks, schools, religious institutions, a library, commercial centers, adjacency to open space and recreational areas, and access to transportation.

Neighborhoods and associations 
 University Community Association
 The Terrace Community Association
 Parkside Community Association
 Parkcrest Community Association
 Village Park Community Association
 Parkwood Apartment Homes

Schools and library 
 Rancho San Joaquin Middle School
 University Park Elementary 
 Village Montessori
 University Park Library (a branch of Orange County Public Libraries system)

Parks and open space and recreational facilities 
 University Community Park
 Adventure Playground
 Dave Robins Park (private)
 Quail Hill Preserve (access from Shady Canyon Drive in the Quail Hill neighborhood)
 Sand Canyon Wash 
 Tanaka Farms
 Strawberry Farms Golf Course
 William R. Mason Regional Park (access from University Drive in the Rancho San Joaquin neighborhood)

Religious institutions 
 Light of Christ Lutheran Church
 University United Methodist Church

Commercial centers 
 University Park Center
 Parkview Center

Transportation 
 Orange County Transportation Authority (OCTA) bus routes
 San Diego (I-405) Freeway
 San Joaquin Hills (SR-73) Transportation Corridor (2.1 miles west via University Drive)
 John Wayne Airport (2.3 miles west via Michelson Drive)

References 

Irvine, California
Orange County, California
Villages of Irvine, California